Tabarie Joil Henry (born 1 December 1987, in Saint Thomas) is a United States Virgin Islands sprinter who specializes in the 400 metres. His personal best time is 20.71 seconds in the 200 metres and 44.77 in the 400 metres, achieved in April 2009 in Arkansas City, Kansas and in May 2009 in Hutchinson, Kansas respectively. He is affiliated with Barton County Community College and Texas A&M University, where he was a national champion in 2010 and 2011.

He competed in the 400 metres event at the 2008 Olympic Games, but did not reach the final round. He did however achieve a personal best time of 45.19 seconds. He also competed in the 2009 World Championships in Berlin, Germany where he placed 4th in the finals, and 2011 World Championships in Daegu, Korea where he placed 7th. In 2012 he took part in the men's 400 metres at the 2012 Olympic Games in London, where he placed 6th in the first heat of the semi-finals.

Achievements

References
sports-reference

1987 births
Living people
United States Virgin Islands male sprinters
American male sprinters
Olympic track and field athletes of the United States Virgin Islands
Athletes (track and field) at the 2008 Summer Olympics
Athletes (track and field) at the 2012 Summer Olympics
World Athletics Championships athletes for the United States Virgin Islands
Henry, Tabarie
Texas A&M Aggies men's track and field athletes
People from Saint Thomas, U.S. Virgin Islands
Barton Cougars men's track and field athletes
Junior college men's track and field athletes in the United States
Central American and Caribbean Games silver medalists for the United States Virgin Islands
Competitors at the 2010 Central American and Caribbean Games
Central American and Caribbean Games medalists in athletics